Brinje is a settlement northeast of Ljubljana in the Municipality of Dol pri Ljubljani in the Upper Carniola region of Slovenia.

References

External links

Brinje on Geopedia

Populated places in the Municipality of Dol pri Ljubljani